The 1912–13 Indiana State Sycamores men's basketball team represented Indiana State University during the 1912–13 college men's basketball season. The head coach was Alfred Westphal, coaching the sycamores in his first season. The team played their home games at North Hall in Terre Haute, Indiana.

Roster
The Sycamores were led by Jim Clark, the team Captain. He was followed by Noble Wilson, Dale Stiffler, Henry Knauth, William Unverferth, _ Vermillion, _ Hyndman, _ Johnson, _ Fishback and _ Warren.

Schedule

|-

References

Indiana State Sycamores men's basketball seasons
Indiana State
Indiana State
Indiana State